Lichtheimiaceae is a family of fungi in the order Mucorales. The family was circumscribed in 2013 after a molecular phylogenetic analysis helped delineate a new family structure for the Mucorales.

Genera
Circinella  – 11 spp.
Dichotomocladium  – 5 spp.
Fennellomyces  – 4 spp.
Lichtheimia  – 7 spp.
Phascolomyces  – 1 sp.
Rhizomucor  – 6 spp.
Thamnostylum  – 4 spp.
Thermomucor  – 1 sp.
Zychaea  – 1 sp.

References

Zygomycota
Fungus families
Taxa described in 2009